Jean Murat (13 July 1888 in Périgueux – 5 January 1968 in Aix-en-Provence) was a French actor. He was married to the French actress Annabella.

Selected filmography

 Sex (1920)
 La Galerie des monstres (1924), as Sveti
 Carmen (1926), as Officier
 Attorney for the Heart (1927), as Dr. Robert Lingh
 The Prey of the Wind (1927), as The husband
 The Duel (1927)
 Valencia (1927), as Count Alfonso de Padilla
 Homesick (1927)
  Escape from Hell (1928), as Erik Ward
 The Carousel of Death (1928)
 Nile Water (1928)
 Masks (1929), as Jonny
 Venus (1929), as Capitaine Franqueville
 The Divine Voyage (1929), as Jacques de Saint-Ermont
 The Night Is Ours (1930), as Henri Brécourt
  The Love Market (1930)
 A Hole in the Wall (1930), as André de Kerdrec
 La Femme d'une nuit (1931), as Jean d'Armont
 The Typist (1931), as Paul Derval
 Captain Craddock (1931), as Captain Craddock
 77 Rue Chalgrin (1931), as Baron de Cléves
 The Last Blow (1932), as Captain Colbec
 Companion Wanted (1932), as Lord Kingdale
 Narcotics (1932), as Henri Werner
 The Man with the Hispano (1933)
 F.P.1 (French-language version, 1933), as Capitaine Droste
 Mademoiselle Josette, My Woman (1933), as André Ternay
 The Typist Gets Married (1934), as Paul Derval
 The Lady of Lebanon (1934), as Captain Domèvre
 Carnival in Flanders (1935), as Duke of Olivares
 Second Bureau (1935), as Capitaine Benoit
 Les mutinés de l'Elseneur (1936), as Jack Pathurst
 Anne-Marie (1936), as Le Penseur
 Aloha, le chant des îles (1937), as Capitaine Guy Rungis
 I Was an Adventuress (1938), as Pierre Glorin
 Nights of Princes (1938), as Forestier
 Mademoiselle Swing (1942), as Armand de Vinci
 The Lost Woman (1942), as Jean Dubart
 Lawless Roads (1947), as Florent Lemercier
 Bethsabée (1949), as Colonel
 On the Riviera (1951), as Felix Periton
 Rich, Young and Pretty (1951), as Henri Milan
 Alarm in Morocco (1953), as Colonel
 The Night Is Ours (1953), as Colonel Gribaldi
 Royal Affairs in Versailles (1954), as Louvois
 The Big Flag (1954) 
 The Red Cloak (1955)
 Lady Chatterley's Lover (1955), as Baron Leslie Winter
 Three Sailors (1957), as Chief of the Secret Service
 The Fox of Paris (1957)
 Ces dames préfèrent le mambo (1957), as Henry Legrand
 Paris Holiday (1958), as Judge
 Les Misérables (1958), as Colonel Georges Pontmercy
 Call Girls of Rome (1960), as General Masetti
 It Happened in Athens (1962), as Pierre de Coubertin
 The Avenger of Venice (1964), as Candiano

References

External links

1888 births
1968 deaths
French male film actors
French male silent film actors
People from Périgueux
20th-century French male actors